The Homecoming is a statue expressing the joy of reunion between a family when the sailor returns from a long period at sea.  The statue honors the sacrifices made by families and members of all the sea services during long separations.

The Homecoming was sculpted by Stanley Bleifeld, who also created the well known The Lone Sailor.  The original work is located in the United States Navy Memorial, in Washington, DC.  There are full sized copies in Town Point Park, Norfolk, Virginia;  Riverfront Park, North Charleston, South Carolina; and Tuna Harbor Park, San Diego, California.

References 
 The Homecoming at the United States Navy Memorial

Bronze sculptures in Washington, D.C.
1989 sculptures
Bronze sculptures in South Carolina
Bronze sculptures in California
Bronze sculptures in Virginia
Statues in San Diego
Statues in South Carolina
Statues in Virginia
Statues in Washington, D.C.
Sculptures of men in Washington, D.C.
Monuments and memorials in the United States
Sculptures of men in Virginia
Sculptures of men in South Carolina
Sculptures of men in California